Sawai Mansingh Indoor Stadium is an indoor stadium located in Jaipur, Rajasthan, India. Facilities includes air conditioning, player change rooms and lounge, with control and medical rooms, media centre, state-of-the-art-acoustics and parking facilities and maple wood flooring at playing field. The stadium can also be used for many non sporting events and it can accommodate any indoor sporting event played at the Olympics.  The stadium is owed and managed by Rajasthan State Sports Council. The stadium is the home of the Pro Kabaddi League team Jaipur Pink Panthers owned by actor Abhishek Bachchan.
The Jaipur Pink Panthers won the inaugural edition of the league in 2014.

Pro Kabaddi League

2015 Pro Kabaddi League

See also

 Rajasthan State Sports Council
 Sawai Mansingh Stadium

References

Indoor arenas in India
Basketball venues in India
Volleyball venues in India
Handball venues in India
Kabaddi venues in India
Sports venues in Jaipur
Sports venues completed in 2006
2006 establishments in Rajasthan